Amphidromus kruehni is a species of air-breathing land snail, a terrestrial pulmonate gastropod mollusk in the family Camaenidae.

This is the only dextral species in the subgenus Syndromus.

References

External links 

kruehni